Calm Down is the debut extended play from Australian electronic DJ and producer Alison Wonderland. In an interview with Beat Magazine, Wonderland said, "I wrote all of those songs in a week. I had this huge burst of creativity, got really inspired and just wrote them all." It was released on 27 June 2014 via EMI Music Australia.

Critical reception
Steph Payton from The AU Review gave the EP 9.7 out of 10, saying: "Before even reaching the one minute mark of the first track on Alison Wonderland's debut EP Calm Down you know this is the one you have been waiting for. Wonderland has packed everything that makes her live shows instant sell out's into five incredible songs. Powerful bass, stunning vocals and exciting samples."

Stephanie Tell from The Music gave the EP 3.5 out of 5, saying: "Drawing heavily on Flume, The Knife and M.I.A., Alison Wonderland's ultra-hip Calm Down has a split personality; straddling trashy club and clever EDM. Either way, listeners should find something to love between [the] use of adventurous, solemn strings and punchy, stop-start beats.".

Andrew Le from Renowned for Sound gave the EP 3.5 stars out of 5, calling it a "decent debut".

Singles
"I Want U" was released as the first single on 2 May 2014. The song peaked at number 38 on the ARIA Charts and was certified gold. "Cold" was released as the second single in September 2014.

Track listing

Release history

References

2014 debut EPs
Alison Wonderland albums